The Otto W. and Ida L. Nelson House is a house located in southeast Portland, Oregon, listed on the National Register of Historic Places.

See also
 National Register of Historic Places listings in Southeast Portland, Oregon

References

Further reading

1896 establishments in Oregon
Buckman, Portland, Oregon
Houses completed in 1896
Houses on the National Register of Historic Places in Portland, Oregon
Portland Eastside MPS
Queen Anne architecture in Oregon
Portland Historic Landmarks